Bowdon Hockey Club is a field hockey club based in Bowdon, Greater Manchester, England. The hockey club was established in 1886 but the Bowdon Club which hosts the team was formed in 1856.

The men's 1st XI play in the Men's England Hockey League and the ladies 1st XI (known as Bowdon Hightown Ladies 1st XI ) play in the Investec Women's Hockey League. The club fields ten men's teams, seven ladies teams and various youth sides. The women's team is known as Bowdon Hightown due to the 2004 merger of the Hightown Hockey Club ladies section and Bowdon Hockey Club.

Major national honours
National Champions
 2008–09 Women's League Champions

National Cup Winners
 2005–06 Women's National Cup Winners
 2006–07 Women's National Cup Winners
 2008–09 Women's National Cup Winners
 2010–11 Women's National Cup Winners
 2012–13 Women's National Cup Winners
 2018–19 Men's Championship Cup Winners (formerly National Cup)

Notable players

Men's internationals

Women's internationals

References

English field hockey clubs
1886 establishments in England
Field hockey clubs established in 1856